Vodranci is a settlement in the Municipality of Ormož in northeastern Slovenia. It lies north of Središče ob Dravi, close to the border with Croatia. The area belongs to the traditional region of Styria. It is now included in the Drava Statistical Region.

There is a small roadside chapel in the northeastern part of the settlement.  It was built in the early 20th century.

References

External links
 Vodranci on Geopedia

Populated places in the Municipality of Ormož